Glen Lyndley Gibb is a New Zealand former rugby league footballer who represented New Zealand.

Playing career
Gibb played for Runanga in the West Coast Rugby League competition. He was a West Coast and South Island representative. In 1985 Gibb was selected for the New Zealand national rugby league team, however he did not play in a Test match.

In 1988 Gibb joined Cobden-Kohinoor and he later played for the Suburbs club.

References

Living people
New Zealand rugby league players
New Zealand national rugby league team players
West Coast rugby league team players
South Island rugby league team players
Runanga players
Rugby league halfbacks
Suburbs (West Coast) players
Cobden-Kohinoor players
Year of birth missing (living people)